Umred-Pauni-Karhandla Wildlife Sanctuary, about 50 km from Nagpur and 60  km from Bhandara, is spread over Pauni Tahsil of Bhandara district and Umred, Kuhi and Bhivapur Taluka of Nagpur district. This sanctuary has a connection with Tadoba Andhari Tiger Reserve through the forest along Wainganga river. The sanctuary is home to resident breeding tigers, herds of Gaur, wild dogs and rare animals like flying squirrels, pangolins and honey badgers.

It is bounded roughly by the Wainganga river and the Gose Khurd Dam on the northeast, State Highway 9 and Bhiwapur Town on the south, Umred on the west and a narrow 10 km long range of 600 – 800 m hills to the northwest. It is located 40 km north of Tadoba-Andhari Tiger Reserve and 50 km southwest of Nagzira Wildlife Sanctuary & 60 km from Nagpur, Maharashtra. Pench Tiger Reserve is 80 km to the northwest

The number of tourists is increasing because it is very close to the Umred and Nagpur city. Tigers are commonly seen here by many villages around the sanctuary.

Wildlife

According to a 2014 report in the India Times, 11 tigers, six leopards are in the sanctuary, in addition to wild dogs, sloth bears, bisons, nilgais, deer and sambars.

In 2009, Umred-Karhandla was identified as having a good source population of tigers.

Mammal species such as the Bengal tiger, Indian leopard, Indian bison, blue bull, chital, sambar deer, barking deer, mouse deer, monkey, wild boar, sloth bear, and wild dog live here. 
Tigers

The Wildlife Institute of India (WII) estimated the presence of three tigers in and around the sanctuary but the number has increased to five, with three new cubs sighted in March 2011. The field director of Umred Karhandla Wildlife Sanctuary said the 2011 births seemed to be the first litter of this tigress. "Better protection, good prey base and availability of water are three key factors why Bor is becoming a safe haven for tigers. Now the number of tigers has soared up steadily. The sanctuary now has three resident females rearing 10 cubs.,"
As per the 2015-16 tiger estimation report, there are five or six tigers in the Umred Karhandla Wildlife Sanctuary.

Birds
There are more than 90 species of birds belonging to 22 families of 12 different orders recorded in the sanctuary. This includes over 10 species of migratory birds and over seven species of endangered birds. 
Reptiles
The reserve is home to over 19 species of reptiles belonging to nine families, of which four species are endangered, namely, Indian cobra, Russell’s viper, Indian rock python, Indian rat snake, Chequered keelback and monitor lizard.

Tourism and conservation 

The sanctuary provides connectivity between key tiger reserves like Tadoba, Pench, Bor and Nagzira. It thus also serves to reduce pressure of tourists and tourist-related activities from those protected areas because they are more eco-sensitive.

Several water management programs have been created by the tiger protection NGO Wildlife Trust of India (WTI).

About 100 km of motorable road have been developed, out of which tourists are allowed on 44 km. The road can handle about 40 vehicles - 20 in the morning and 20 in the evening.

The Forest Department has trained about 20 villagers from the nearby and surrounding areas as guides which provides them employment.

The main entrance of the sanctuary is at Karhandla village.

The following statistics pertain to the 2013-14 tourist season from 16 October to 28 February:
7,504 tourists (1,454 vehicles) visited Umred-Karhandla.
17,215 tourists (3,455 vehicles) visited Pench National Park.
6,551 tourists (1,190 vehicles) visited Bor Wildlife Sanctuary.

Recently, there has been a sharp drop in ecotourism in the sanctuary. This has been attributed to the disappearance of Jai (the iconic tiger), ban on private vehicles & doubling of gate fee.

Entry gates 

Sanctuary can be access through 3 gates(Kharandla gate, Pauni gate, Gothangaon gate).

References

External links

Tiger reserves of India
Nagpur district
Wildlife sanctuaries in Maharashtra
Protected areas established in 2013
Tourist attractions in Nagpur district
2013 establishments in Maharashtra